Us Mob were an early Aboriginal reggae rock band from South Australia. The band was formed with the help of the Centre for Aboriginal Studies in Music in Adelaide.

Overview 
Us Mob appeared in the film Wrong Side of the Road with fellow CASM band No Fixed Address The recording of the soundtrack made the two bands the first contemporary aboriginal bands to be recorded. Along with No Fixed Address they were nominated for the 1981 AFI Award for Best Original Music for the music from the film. They relocated to Sydney and broke up after their equipment was destroyed by a fire. The band were the subject of an ABC Message Stick documentary in February 2000.

Members 
Ronnie Ansell - Bass
Pedro Butler - Guitar/vocals
Carroll Karpany - Guitar
Wally McArthur - Drums

Discography

Soundtrack

References

External links 
 AFI Screen Biographies for Wrong Side of the Road
 annotated bibliographical records for Wrong Side of the Road

South Australian musical groups
Indigenous Australian musical groups
Reggae rock groups